Ticlacayán District is one of thirteen districts of the Pasco Province in the Pasco Region of Peru. Its seat is Ticlacayán.

Geography 
The Waqurunchu mountain range traverses the district. Other mountains are listed below:

References